Carbonara di Nola is a comune (municipality) in the Metropolitan City of Naples in the Italian region Campania, located about 30 km east of Naples.

Carbonara di Nola borders the following municipalities: Domicella, Lauro, Liveri, Palma Campania.

References

Cities and towns in Campania